Okumaella is a monotypic genus of East Asian comb-footed spiders containing the single species, Okumaella okumae. It was first described by H. Yoshida in 2009, and is found in Japan. This genus is named in honour of the Japanese arachnologist Chiyoko Okuma.

See also
 List of Theridiidae species

References

Further reading

Monotypic Araneomorphae genera
Spiders of Asia
Theridiidae